Kezieh  Ibe (born 6 December 1982) is an English footballer who plays for Enfield Town as a striker.

He has previously played for Yeovil Town in the Football League, and several non-League clubs including Ebbsfleet United, Farnborough and twice for Chelmsford City.

His most recent transfer was from Egham Town of the Isthmian League South Central Division to Enfield Town of the Premier Division, in January 2019.

References

External links

Aylesbury profile

Wimbledon Heritage profile

1982 births
Living people
Association football forwards
Arsenal F.C. players
AFC Bournemouth players
Leatherhead F.C. players
Hampton & Richmond Borough F.C. players
Aylesbury United F.C. players
Staines Town F.C. players
Yeovil Town F.C. players
Tiverton Town F.C. players
Exeter City F.C. players
Weymouth F.C. players
St Albans City F.C. players
Canvey Island F.C. players
Chelmsford City F.C. players
Ebbsfleet United F.C. players
AFC Wimbledon players
Farnborough F.C. players
Eastbourne Borough F.C. players
Sutton United F.C. players
Basingstoke Town F.C. players
Hendon F.C. players
Harlow Town F.C. players
Beaconsfield Town F.C. players
Egham Town F.C. players
English Football League players
National League (English football) players
Isthmian League players
Southern Football League players
English footballers